This is a list of properties and districts in Jefferson County, Georgia that are listed on the National Register of Historic Places (NRHP).

Current listings

|}

References

Jefferson
Buildings and structures in Jefferson County, Georgia